The knockout stage of the 2013 FIFA Confederations Cup began on 26 June with the semi-final round, and concluded on 30 June 2013 with the final at the Estádio do Maracanã, Rio de Janeiro. The top two teams from each group advanced to the knockout stage to compete in a single-elimination style tournament. A third place match was included and played between the two losing teams of the semi-finals.

In the knockout stage (including the final), if a match was level at the end of 90 minutes, extra time of two periods (15 minutes each) would be played. If the score was still level after extra time, the match would be decided by a penalty shoot-out.

Qualified teams

Bracket

Semi-finals

Brazil vs Uruguay

Spain vs Italy

Third place play-off

Final

References

External links
2013 FIFA Confederations Cup

2013 FIFA Confederations Cup
Brazil at the 2013 FIFA Confederations Cup
Spain at the 2013 FIFA Confederations Cup
Italy at the 2013 FIFA Confederations Cup
Uruguay at the 2013 FIFA Confederations Cup
Brazil–Uruguay football rivalry